Ian McLachlan (born 1936) is a former Australian politician who served as a member of the House of Representatives from 1990 to 1998.

Ian McLachlan may also refer to:

 Ian McLachlan (writer), Canadian writer and academic
 Ian Dougald McLachlan (1911–1991), Royal Australian Air Force officer
 C. Ian McLachlan (born 1942), justice of the Connecticut Supreme Court